Duells Corners (also spelled Deuels Corners or Dewells Corners) is a hamlet  in the town of Orchard Park in Erie County, New York, United States.

References

Hamlets in New York (state)
Hamlets in Erie County, New York